The Daughter-in-Law is the first play by D. H. Lawrence, completed in January 1913. Lawrence described it as "neither a tragedy nor a comedy - just ordinary". It was neither staged nor published in his lifetime.

The first stage production, by Peter Gill at the Royal Court Theatre in 1967, contributed to a reappraisal of Lawrence's dramatic writing. In 1968 The Times Literary Supplement said it was "a fine and moving piece of work" that "ought to be as well known as Sons and Lovers and the best Nottinghamshire stories". In 2012 the critic Michael Billington described it as "quite extraordinary ... one of the great British dramas of the 20th century".

Characters
 Mrs Gascoyne
 Mrs Purdy
 Joe Gascoyne
 Minnie Gascoyne
 Luther Gascoyne
 Cabman

Production history
The play premiered on 16 March 1967 at the Royal Court Theatre, London, directed by Peter Gill. The cast comprised Gabrielle Daye, Anne Dyson, Victor Henry, Judy Parfitt and Mike Pratt.

It was revived at The Young Vic in 2002 directed by Artistic Director David Lan. With The Guardian calling it "one of the great British dramas of the 20th century".

The Mint Theater Company produced the play in 2003 in New York City  with The New York Times naming it a top ten production of the year.

Arcola Theatre produced the play in 2018 directed by Jack Gamble

Adaptations
In 2015 the National Theater co-produced with the Royal Exchange Theater Husbands and Sons an adaption that wove together The Daughter-In-Law, A Collier’s Friday Night, and The Widowing of Mrs Holroyd into a single three hour narrative. The three D. H. Lawrence plays were adapted by Ben Power and the production was directed by Marianne Elliott

References

Sources
Worthen, John D.H. Lawrence: The Early Years 1885-1912 Cambridge: Cambridge University Press, 1991. 458–60.

External links
 Full text at Project Gutenberg Australia

1912 plays
Plays by D. H. Lawrence
1910s debut plays